Mian Mumtaz Daulatana (Punjabi), (20 February 1916 – 30 January 1995) was a Pakistani politician and a key supporter of Pakistan Movement in British India. After independence, he served as the second Chief Minister of West Punjab in Pakistan.

Early life
Daultana was born in Luddan in 1916, the son of Nawab Ahmad Yar Khan Daultana, a wealthy Punjabi landowner. He belonged to the Daultana clan of the Johiya tribe. His father was a supporter of the Unionist Party in the Punjab, whilst his uncle Chaudhry Sir Shahab-ud-Din was the first speaker of the Provincial Assembly of the Punjab. Daultana studied history at Government College, Lahore, graduating in 1933. Thereafter he moved to the United Kingdom and completed a Master of Arts at Corpus Christi College, Oxford. Whilst at the University of Oxford he was elected President of the Indian society. He was called to the Bar at Middle Temple in 1939.

Career

Pakistan movement
Daultana joined the Punjab Muslim League in 1942 despite being from a leading Unionist family. In 1944 he assisted in drafting the League's manifesto, promising civil liberties, elimination of official interference in elections and a progressive economic policy. He was elected to the Punjab Legislative Assembly in 1946. Daultana was of the opinion that the unity of India could not be preserved and that Muslims of the Punjab should unite with their co-religionists across India in the demand for Pakistan.

Chief Minister of West Punjab
Following the creation of Pakistan, the Muslim League assumed control of the new West Punjab province. Iftikhar Hussain Khan Mamdot, as Chief Minister of West Punjab appointed Daultana to his cabinet alongside other scions of leading rural families Mian Iftikharuddin and Shaukat Hayat Khan. Conflicts plagued the cabinet, and Mian Iftikharuddin left to found the Azad Pakistan Party and was soon joined by Shaukat Hayat Khan.

In 1951, after elections in West Punjab, Daultana was chosen as parliamentary leader of the Muslim League in the Punjab Assembly and invited to form a government. Daultana's cabinet, which contained just one refugee politician, was characterised as a cabinet of landlords. As Chief Minister he soon banned the Urdu daily newspaper Nawa-i-Waqt which had been a supporter of Mamdot and introduced agrarian reforms within the Punjab.  Daultana regarded these land reforms, which in theory gave tenants full security for tenure as long as they paid their rent and took care of the land, as the most progressive in the world. Critics however labelled them as merely cosmetic, as they  made no reference to a ceiling for large estates and only tried to increase tenants' share of produce by ten percent. In reality, the regulations had little effect and landlords instead attempted to divert attention towards the jagirs held by rival politicians who had opposed the Pakistan movement. His government proposed the abolition of all jagirs made in the Punjab since 1857. This proposal met with considerable opposition, and was amended to target certain influential persons who were given grants for unpatriotic and anti-national activities in pre-independence days. Grants of land to religious institutions or to the military personnel were exempted The scope of the Act was further narrowed to include only grants made under the government of Unionist Premier Sir Khizar Hayat Tiwana between 1945 and 1947.

Lahore Martial Law 1953
During his tenure, anti-Ahmadi sentiment intensified stoked by Islamist groups such as the Majlis-e-Ahrar-ul-Islam and Majlis-e-Tahaffuz-e-Khatme Nabuwwat. In 1951 they issued demands that Ahmadis be declared non-Muslims for legal purposes, that Sir Zafarullah Khan the Ahmadi Minister of Foreign Affairs resign and that Ahmadi's be banned from holding political office. During the 1953 Lahore riots despite the protesters demands being rejected by the central government, Daultana lent them his support. However, when he was unable to control the rioters, the central government called in the army and imposed martial law in Lahore. Within days of Prime Minister, Sir Khawaja Nazimuddin's arrival in Lahore, Daultana had resigned. He was succeeded by Sir Feroz Khan Noon.

Later activities
He was also Defence Minister of Pakistan in the short-lived government of Ibrahim Ismail Chundrigar in 1957.  He served as  High Commissioner to the United Kingdom between 1972 and 1979.

Tehmina Daultana former minister and Pakistan Muslim League (N) (PML-N) MNA (Member of National Assembly of Pakistan) is his niece.

See also
 Daulatana
 Azeem Daultana
 Tehmina Daultana

References

External links
 Government of Punjab, Pakistan
 Punjab Assembly Website

 

1916 births
1995 deaths
Chief Ministers of Punjab, Pakistan
Defence Ministers of Pakistan
High Commissioners of Pakistan to the United Kingdom
Punjabi people
People from Vehari District
Pakistani MNAs 1947–1954
Mumtaz
Pakistan Movement activists from Punjab
Pakistani landowners
Punjab, Pakistan MLAs 1947–1949
Punjab, Pakistan MLAs 1951–1955
Members of the Constituent Assembly of Pakistan